Trevegean (from , meaning "farm of the chaff") is a hamlet south of St Just, Cornwall, England, United Kingdom. Trevegean Downs are west of the B3306 main road.

References

Hamlets in Cornwall